Boris Nemšić (born on August 17, 1957, in Sarajevo, Bosnia and Herzegovina) is a Bosnian-Austrian businessman and the former CEO of Telekom Austria. From April 2009 until June 2010 he was CEO of VimpelCom.

He current holds various board member positions at the following companies: Delta Partners Group (executive board member), I-New Unified Mobile Solutions (chairman of the board), Cellwize (chairman of the board) or Frequentis AG (member of the supervisory board).

Notes and references 

Austrian businesspeople
Austrian chief executives
Bosnia and Herzegovina emigrants to Austria
Businesspeople from Sarajevo
1957 births
Living people
VEON